Eveliina Rosa Heinäluoma (born 27 February 1988 in Helsinki) is a Finnish politician currently serving in the Parliament of Finland for the Social Democratic Party of Finland at the Helsinki constituency.

References

1988 births
Living people
Politicians from Helsinki
Social Democratic Party of Finland politicians
Members of the Parliament of Finland (2019–23)
21st-century Finnish women politicians
Women members of the Parliament of Finland